Beehive Live is a live album by Paul Gilbert, formerly of the heavy metal band Racer X and the hard rock band Mr. Big. It was released in 1999.

Track listing

Notes

 Many of the tracks appear on the Eleven Thousand Notes DVD. "Heavy Disco Trip", "Karn Evil 9", and "Bumblebee" are the only tunes missing
 On the song "Tell the Truth", the band breaks into a blues riff that was originally heard on the song "Double Trouble" on Paul's first solo album King of Clubs. The final tune on the album "The Jam" is entirely that same riff, while Gilbert solos over it
 All noted tracks are arranged by Paul Gilbert.

Personnel
 Paul Gilbert - Guitar, vocals, mixing, producer, Audio Production
 Billy Morris - Guitar, background vocals
 Jeff Martin - Drums, background vocals
 Mike Szuter - Bass guitar, background vocals
 Scotty Johnson - Guitar, keyboards, background vocals

Production
 Steve Hall - Mastering
 Tom Size - Engineer
 Recording information - Tokyo at Shibuya On Air East
 Hiroyuki Yoshihama - Photography
 William James - Cover Photo
 Larry Freemantle - Art Direction

References

Paul Gilbert albums
1999 live albums
Shrapnel Records albums